Elizabeth Scott, Duchess of Buccleuch (29 May 1743 – 21 November 1827), formerly Lady Elizabeth Montagu, was the wife of Henry Scott, 3rd Duke of Buccleuch.

Biography
Lady Elizabeth was the eldest daughter of George Montagu, 1st Duke of Montagu, and his wife, Mary. She was baptised at St George's, Hanover Square. Her maternal great-grandparents were John Churchill, 1st Duke of Marlborough and his wife Sarah. The death of her brother, John Montagu, Marquess of Monthermer, unmarried and without heirs, in 1770, resulted in the barony of Montagu passing to her children.

The couple were married on 2 May 1767, at Montagu House, Whitehall.  They had seven children:

Lady Elizabeth Scott (died 1837), who married Alexander Home, 10th Earl of Home, and had children
George Scott, Earl of Dalkeith (1768–1768), who died in infancy
Lady Mary Scott (1769–1823), who married James Stopford, 3rd Earl of Courtown and had children
Sir Charles William Henry Montagu Scott, 4th Duke of Buccleuch & 6th Duke of Queensberry (1772–1819)
Lady Caroline Scott (1774–1854), who married Charles Douglas, 6th Marquess of Queensberry, and had children
Henry James Montagu Scott, 2nd Baron Montagu of Boughton (16 December 1776 – 30 October 1845)
Lady Harriet Scott (1780–1833), who married William Kerr, 6th Marquess of Lothian and had children

Her husband died in 1812 and her son became the Duke. He had the Duchess Bridge at Langholme rebuilt in iron the following year. The bridge was named for the Duchess of Buccleagh. In 2021 it was considered to be Scotland's oldest iron bridge.

The duchess died, aged 84, in Richmond, Surrey, and was buried at Warkton, Northamptonshire.

References

1743 births
1827 deaths
18th-century English nobility
18th-century English women
19th-century English women
19th-century English people
British duchesses by marriage
Elizabeth
Daughters of British dukes
Elizabeth
Peerage of Scotland
Burials in Northamptonshire